Nightjars are medium-sized nocturnal or crepuscular birds in the family Caprimulgidae  and order Caprimulgiformes, characterised by long wings, short legs, and very short bills. They are sometimes called goatsuckers, due to the ancient folk tale that they sucked the milk from goats (the Latin for goatsucker is caprimulgus), or bugeaters, their primary source of food being insects. Some New World species are called nighthawks. The English word "nightjar" originally referred to the European nightjar.

Nightjars are found all around the world, with the exception of Antarctica and certain island groups such as the Seychelles. They can be found in a variety of habitats, most commonly the open country with some vegetation. They usually nest on the ground, with a habit of resting and roosting on roads.

The subfamilies of nightjars have similar characteristics, including small feet, of little use for walking, and long, pointed wings. Typical nightjars, though, have rictal bristles, longer bills, and softer plumage. The colour of their plumage and their unusual perching habits help conceal them during the day.

Systematics

Caprimulgiformes 
Previously, all members of the orders Apodiformes, Aegotheliformes, Nyctibiiformes, Podargiformes, and Steatornithiformes were lumped alongside nightjars in the Caprimulgiformes. In 2021, the International Ornithological Congress redefined the Caprimulgiformes as only applying to nightjars, with potoos, frogmouths, oilbirds, and owlet-nightjars all being reclassified into their own orders. See Strisores for more info about the disputes over the taxonomy of Caprimulgiformes. A phylogenetic analysis found that the extinct family Archaeotrogonidae, known from the Eocene and Oligocene of Europe, are the closest known relatives of nightjars.

Caprimulgidae 
Traditionally, nightjars have been divided into two subfamilies - the Caprimulginae, or typical nightjars with 79 known species, and the Chordeilinae, or nighthawks of the New World, with 10 known species. The groups are similar in most respects, but the typical nightjars have rictal bristles, longer bills, and softer plumage. Their soft plumage is cryptically coloured to resemble bark or leaves, and some species, unusual for birds, perch along a branch rather than across it, helping to conceal them during the day. The subfamilies of nightjars have similar characteristics, including small feet, of little use for walking, and long, pointed wings. 

The common poorwill,  Phalaenoptilus nuttallii, is unique as a bird that undergoes a form of hibernation, becoming torpid and with a much reduced body temperature for weeks or months, although other nightjars can enter a state of torpor for shorter periods.

In their pioneering DNA-DNA hybridisation work, Sibley and Ahlquist found that the genetic difference between the eared nightjars and the typical nightjars was, in fact, greater than that between the typical nightjars and the nighthawks of the New World. Accordingly, they placed the eared nightjars in a separate family, the Eurostopodidae (9 known species), but the family has not yet been widely adopted.

Subsequent work, both morphological and genetic, has provided support for the separation of the typical and the eared nightjars, and some authorities have adopted this Sibley-Ahlquist recommendation, and also the more far-reaching one to group all the owls (traditionally Strigiformes) together in the Caprimulgiformes. The listing below retains a more orthodox arrangement, but recognises the eared nightjars as a separate group. For more detail and an alternative classification scheme, see Caprimulgiformes and Sibley-Ahlquist taxonomy.

 †Ventivorus Mourer-Chauviré 1988
 Subfamily Eurostopodinae
 Genus Eurostopodus (7 species)
 Genus Lyncornis (2 species)
 Subfamily Caprimulginae (typical nightjars)
 Genus Gactornis – collared nightjar
 Genus Nyctipolus – (2 species)
 Genus Nyctidromus – (2 species)
 Genus Hydropsalis – (4 species)
 Genus Siphonorhis – (2 species)
 Genus Nyctiphrynus – (4 species)
 Genus Phalaenoptilus – common poorwill
 Genus Antrostomus – (12 species)
 Genus Caprimulgus – (40 species, including the European nightjar)
 Genus Setopagis – (4 species) 
 Genus Uropsalis – (2 species)
 Genus Macropsalis – long-trained nightjar
 Genus Eleothreptus – (2 species)
 Genus Systellura – (2 species)
 Subfamily Chordeilinae (nighthawks)
 Genus Chordeiles (6 species; includes Podager)
 Genus Nyctiprogne (2 species)
 Genus Lurocalis (2 species)

Also see a list of nightjars, sortable by common and binomial names.

Distribution and habitat

Nightjars inhabit all continents other than Antarctica, as well as some island groups such as Madagascar, the Seychelles, New Caledonia and the islands of Caribbean. They are not known to live in extremely arid desert regions. Nightjars occupy a wide range of habitats, from deserts to rainforests but are most common in open country with some vegetation.
The nighthawks are confined to the New World, and the eared nightjars to Asia and Australia.

A number of species undertake migrations, although the secretive nature of the family may account for the incomplete understanding of their migratory habits. Species that live in the far north, such as the European nightjar or the common nighthawk, migrate southward with the onset of winter. Geolocators placed on European nightjars in southern England found they wintered in the south of the Democratic Republic of the Congo.
Other species make shorter migrations.

Conservation and status
Some species of nightjars are threatened with extinction. Road-kills of this species by cars are thought to be a major cause of mortality for many members of the family because of their habit of resting and roosting on roads.

They also usually nest on the ground, laying one or two patterned eggs directly onto bare ground. Nightjars possibly move their eggs and chicks from the nesting site in the event of danger by carrying them in their mouths. This suggestion has been repeated many times in ornithology books, but surveys of nightjar research have found very little evidence to support this idea.

Developing conservation strategies for some species presents a particular challenge in that scientists do not have enough data to determine whether or not a species is endangered due to the difficulty in locating, identifying, and/or categorizing their limited number (e.g. 10,000) known to exist, a good example being the Vaurie's nightjar in China's south-western Xinjiang Province (as seen only once in-hand). Surveys in the 1970s and 1990s failed to find the species., implying that the species has become extinct, endangered, or found only in a few small areas.

In history and popular culture
Nighthawk as a name has been applied to numerous places, characters, and objects throughout history.
 Nebraska's state nickname was once the "Bugeater State" and its people were sometimes called "bugeaters" (presumably named after the common nighthawk). The Nebraska Cornhuskers college athletic teams were also briefly known the Bugeaters, before adopting their current name, also adopted by the state as a whole. A semi-professional soccer team in Nebraska now uses the Bugeaters moniker.
Nightjars feature prominently in the lyrics of the Elton John/Bernie Taupin song "Come Down in Time": "While a cluster of nightjars sang some songs out of tune".  Sting, in an interview about this song and about Elton John, said, "It's a very beautiful song. … I love Bernie's lyrics, and uh, … It is one of those songs you wish you had written. … "

Gallery

References

External links

Nightjar videos on the Internet Bird Collection
Nightjar sounds on xeno-canto.org

 
Taxa named by Nicholas Aylward Vigors